Vic-en-Bigorre (literally Vic in Bigorre) is a commune in the Hautes-Pyrénées department in south-western France.

Geography

Climate

Vic-en-Bigorre has a oceanic climate (Köppen climate classification Cfb).

Population

See also
Communes of the Hautes-Pyrénées department

References

Communes of Hautes-Pyrénées